The 1980–81 NBA season was the SuperSonics 14th season in the NBA.

Draft picks

Roster

Regular season

Season standings

Notes
 z, y – division champions
 x – clinched playoff spot

Record vs. opponents

Game log

 !! Streak
|- align="center" bgcolor="#edbebf"
|  1 || Oct 10 || Los Angeles Lakers || 98–99 || Kingdome || 0–1|| Lost 1
|- align="center" bgcolor="edbebf"
|  2 || Oct 12 || @ Portland Trail Blazers|| 96–107|| Memorial Colliseum || 0–2|| Lost 2
|- align="center" bgcolor="#bbffbb"
| 3 || Oct 14 || @ Dallas Mavericks || 85–83 || Reunion Arena || 1–2|| Won 1
|- align="center" bgcolor="edbebf"
| 4 || Oct 15 || @ Houston Rockets || 100–103 || The Summit ||1–3|| Lost 1
|- align="center" bgcolor="bbffbb"
| 5 || Oct 18 || @ Kansas City Kings ||127–122 || Kemper Arena ||2–3|| Won 1
|- align="center" bgcolor="bbffbb"
| 6 || Oct 20 || @ Utah Jazz ||98–92 || Salt Palace ||3–3|| Won 2
|- align="center" bgcolor="edbebf"
| 7 || Oct 22 || Dallas Mavericks ||102–107|| Kingdome ||3–4|| Lost 1
|- align="center" bgcolor="#edbebf"
|8 || Oct 24 || @ Los Angeles Lakers ||98–104|| The Forum ||3–5|| Lost 2
|- align="center" bgcolor="#edbebf"
|9 || Oct 25 || Phoenix Suns ||75–100|| Kingdome ||3–6|| Lost 3
|- align="center" bgcolor="bbffbb"
|10 || Oct 26 || Portland Trail Blazers||111–98|| Kingdome ||4–6|| Won 1
|- align="center" bgcolor="#bbffbb"
|11 || Oct 28 || Golden State Warriors||119–102|| Kingdome ||5–6|| Won 2
|- align="center" bgcolor="#edbebf"
|12 || Oct 31 || San Antonio Spurs ||96–112|| Kingdome ||5–7|| Lost 1
 !! Streak
|- align="center" bgcolor="#edbebf"
|13 || Nov 1 || @ Denver Nuggets ||118–123|| McNichols Sports Arena ||5–8|| Lost 2
|- align="center" bgcolor="bbffbb"
|14 || Nov 3 || Cleveland Cavaliers ||118–83|| Kingdome ||6–8|| Win 1
|- align="center" bgcolor="edbebf"
|15 || Nov 5 || Denver Nuggets ||117–125|| Kingdome ||6–9|| Lost 1
|- align="center" bgcolor="bbffbb"
|16 || Nov 7 || San Diego Clippers||113–94|| Kingdome ||7–9|| Win 1
|- align="center" bgcolor="edbebf"
|17 || Nov 12 || Utah Jazz||106–114|| Kingdome ||7–10|| Lost 1
|- align="center" bgcolor="bbffbb"
|18 || Nov 14 || Kansas City Kings||127–125|| Kingdome ||8–10|| Won 1
|- align="center" bgcolor="#bbffbb"
|19 || Nov 15 || Houston Rockets||143–139 (OT)|| Kingdome ||9–10|| Won 2
|- align="center" bgcolor="#edbebf"
|20 || Nov 18 || @ Houston Rockets||118–138|| The Summit ||9–11|| Lost 1
|- align="center" bgcolor="bbffbb"
|21 || Nov 21 || @ Dallas Mavericks ||101–91|| Reunion Arena ||10–11|| Win 1
|- align="center" bgcolor="edbebf"
|22 || Nov 23 || @ San Diego Clippers ||99–110|| San Diego Sports Arena ||10–12|| Lost 1
|- align="center" bgcolor="edbebf"
|23 || Nov 26 || @ Phoenix Suns ||103–113|| Arizona Veterans Memorial Coliseum ||10–13|| Lost 2
|- align="center" bgcolor="edbebf"
|24 || Nov 28 || San Diego Clippers||92–93|| Kingdome ||10–14|| Lost 3
|- align="center" bgcolor="bbffbb"
|25 || Nov 30 || New Jersey Nets||113–89|| Kingdome ||11–14|| Won 1
|-
 !! Streak
|- align="center" bgcolor="bbffbb"
|26 || Dec 3 || Chicago Bulls||113–105|| Kingdome ||12–14|| Won 2
|- align="center" bgcolor="bbffbb"
|27 || Dec 6 || @ Utah Jazz||108–98|| Salt Palace ||13–14|| Won 3
|- align="center" bgcolor="bbffbb"
|28 || Dec 8 || San Antonio Spurs||104–99|| Kingdome ||14–14|| Won 4
|- align="center" bgcolor="edbebf"
|29 || Dec 9 || @ Portland Trail Blazers||98–111|| Memorial Coliseum ||14–15|| Lost 1
|- align="center" bgcolor="bbffbb"
|30 || Dec 10 ||@ Golden State Warriors||108–103|| Oakland-Alameda County Coliseum Arena ||15–15|| Win 1
|- align="center" bgcolor="edbebf"
|31 || Dec 12 || Los Angeles Lakers||107–113|| Kingdome ||15–16|| Lost 1
|- align="center" bgcolor="edbebf"
|32 || Dec 14 || @ San Diego Clippers||81–91|| San Diego Sports Arena ||15–17|| Lost 2
|- align="center" bgcolor="bbffbb"
|33 || Dec 17 || Kansas City Kings||101–94|| Kingdome ||16–17|| Won 1
|- align="center" bgcolor="bbffbb"
|34 || Dec 19 || Atlanta Hawks||95–92|| Kingdome ||17–17|| Won 2
|- align="center" bgcolor="edbebf"
|35 || Dec 22 || Phoenix Suns||98–109|| Kingdome ||17–18|| Lost 1
|- align="center" bgcolor="edbebf"
|36 || Dec 26 || Portland Trail Blazers||90–96|| Kingdome ||17–19|| Lost 2
|- align="center" bgcolor="edbebf"
|37 || Dec 27 || @ Golden State Warriors||98–104|| Oakland-Alameda County Coliseum Arena ||17–20|| Lost 3
|- align="center" bgcolor="edbebf"
|38 || Dec 30 || @ San Antonio Spurs||100–102|| HemisFair Arena ||17–21|| Lost 4
|-
 !! Streak
|- align="center" bgcolor="edbebf"
|39 || Jan 2 || Philadelphia 76ers||117–120 (OT)|| Kingdome ||17–22|| Lost 5
|- align="center" bgcolor="bbffbb"
|40 || Jan 5 || Dallas Mavericks||103–89|| Kingdome ||18–22|| Won 1
|- align="center" bgcolor="bbffbb"
|41 || Jan 7 || Detroit Pistons||99–94|| Kingdome ||19–22|| Won 2
|- align="center" bgcolor="edbebf"
|42 || Jan 9 || @ Los Angeles Lakers ||87–92|| The Forum ||19–23|| Lost 1
|- align="center" bgcolor="bbffbb"
|43 || Jan 10 || Denver Nuggets||119–116|| Kingdome ||20–23|| Won 1
|- align="center" bgcolor="edbebf"
|44 || Jan 11 || Golden State Warriors||98–106|| Kingdome ||20–24|| Lost 1
|- align="center" bgcolor="edbebf"
|45 || Jan 13 || @ Phoenix Suns||99–104|| Arizona Veterans Memorial Coliseum ||20–25|| Lost 2
|- align="center" bgcolor="bbffbb"
|46 || Jan 16 || @ Indiana Pacers||95–94|| Market Square Arena ||21–25|| Won 1
|- align="center" bgcolor="edbebf"
|47 || Jan 18 || @ Philadelphia 76ers||92–113|| The Spectrum ||21–26|| Lost 1
|- align="center" bgcolor="edbebf"
|48 || Jan 20 || @ New York Knicks||97–98|| Madison Square Garden ||21–27|| Lost 2
|- align="center" bgcolor="edbebf"
|49 || Jan 21 || @ New Jersey Nets||122–126 (OT)|| Rutgers Athletic Center ||21–28|| Lost 3
|- align="center" bgcolor="edbebf"
|50 || Jan 23 || @ Washington Wizards||91–103|| Capital Centre ||21–29|| Lost 4
|- align="center" bgcolor="edbebf"
|51 || Jan 25 || @ Boston Celtics||106–115|| Boston Garden ||21–30|| Lost 5
|- align="center" bgcolor="edbebf"
|52 || Jan 28 || Milwaukee Bucks ||110–119|| Kingdome ||21–31|| Lost 6
|-
 !! Streak
|- align="center" bgcolor="bbffbb"
|53 || Feb 4 || Washington Bullets ||108–99|| Kingdome ||22–31|| Won 1
|- align="center" bgcolor="edbebf"
|54 || Feb 6 || Kansas City Kings||92–102|| Kingdome ||22–32|| Lost 1
|- align="center" bgcolor="bbffbb"
|55 || Feb 7 || Utah Jazz||96–89|| Kingdome ||23–32|| Won 1
|- align="center" bgcolor="bbffbb"
|56 || Feb 8 || Denver Nuggets||133–112|| Kingdome ||24–32|| Won 2
|- align="center" bgcolor="bbffbb"
|57 || Feb 10 || Boston Celtics||108–107 (OT)|| Kingdome ||25–32|| Won 3
|- align="center" bgcolor="bbffbb"
|58 || Feb 12 || @ Portland Trail Blazers||112–109|| Memorial Coliseum ||26–32|| Won 4
|- align="center" bgcolor="edbebf"
|59 || Feb 14 || @ Chicago Bulls||117–134|| Chicago Stadium ||26–33|| Lost 1
|- align="center" bgcolor="edbebf"
|60 || Feb 15 || @ Kansas City Kings||105–107|| Kemper Arena ||26–34|| Lost 2
|- align="center" bgcolor="bbffbb"
|61 || Feb 17 || @ Utah Jazz||101–98|| Salt Palace ||27–34|| Won 1
|- align="center" bgcolor="edbebf"
|62 || Feb 18 || New York Knicks||103–105|| Kingdome ||27–35|| Lost 1
|- align="center" bgcolor="bbffbb"
|63 || Feb 20 || Phoenix Suns||112–111|| Kingdome ||28–35|| Won 1
|- align="center" bgcolor="edbebf"
|64 || Feb 22 || Houston Rockets||96–111|| Kingdome ||28–36|| Lost 1
|- align="center" bgcolor="bbffbb"
|65 || Feb 24 || @ Dallas Mavericks||102–84|| Reunion Arena ||29–36|| Won 1
|- align="center" bgcolor="edbebf"
|66 || Feb 26 || @ San Antonio Spurs||113–123|| HemisFair Arena ||29–37|| Lost 1
|- align="center" bgcolor="edbebf"
|67 || Feb 27 || @ Houston Rockets||92–96|| The Summit ||29–38|| Lost 2
|-
 !! Streak
|- align="center" bgcolor="edbebf"
|68 || Mar 1 || @ Atlanta Hawks||102–108|| Omni Coliseum ||29–39|| Lost 3
|- align="center" bgcolor="bbffbb"
|69 || Mar 4 || Indiana Pacers||105–93|| Kingdome ||30–39|| Won 1
|- align="center" bgcolor="bbffbb"
|70 || Mar 6 || San Antonio Spurs||102–94|| Kingdome ||31–39|| Won 2
|- align="center" bgcolor="edbebf
|71 || Mar 7 || @ Golden State Warriors||103–106|| Oakland-Alameda County Coliseum Arena ||31–40|| Lost 1
|- align="center" bgcolor="edbebf"
|72 || Mar 8 || San Diego Clippers||92–103|| Kingdome ||31–41|| Lost 2
|- align="center" bgcolor="bbffbb"
|73 || Mar 11 || @ Cleveland Cavaliers||101–95|| Coliseum at Richfield ||32–41|| Won 1
|- align="center" bgcolor="bbffbb"
|74 || Mar 13 || @ Detroit Pistons||102–100|| Pontiac Silverdome ||33–41|| Won 2
|- align="center" bgcolor="edbebf"
|75 || Mar 15 || @ Milwaukee Bucks||108–132|| MECCA Arena ||33–42|| Lost 1
|- align="center" bgcolor="edbebf"
|76 || Mar 17 || @ Denver Nuggets||112–124|| McNichols Sports Arena ||33–43|| Lost 2
|- align="center" bgcolor="edbebf"
|77 || Mar 20 || @ Los Angeles Lakers||119–133|| The Forum ||33–44|| Lost 3
|- align="center" bgcolor="edbebf"
|78 || Mar 22 || @ Phoenix Suns||91–107|| Arizona Veterans Memorial Coliseum ||33–45|| Lost 4
|- align="center" bgcolor="edbebf"
|79 || Mar 24 || @ San Diego Clippers||106–111|| San Diego Sports Arena ||33–46|| Lost 5
|- align="center" bgcolor="edbebf"
|80 || Mar 25 || Portland Trail Blazers||103–112|| Kingdome ||33–47|| Lost 6
|- align="center" bgcolor="edbebf"
|81 || Mar 27 || Los Angeles Lakers||90–97|| Kingdome ||33–48|| Lost 7
|- align="center" bgcolor="bbffbb"
|82 || Mar 29 || Golden State Warriors||96–92|| Kingdome ||34–48|| Won 1
|-

Player statistics

Transactions

Free Agents

References

Seattle SuperSonics seasons
Sea